Joanna III of Navarre may refer to:

Jeanne d'Albret (1528–1572), queen regnant of Navarre
Joanna of Castile (1479–1555), Queen of Castile and Aragon